Musa Dagh (meaning "Moses Mountain") is a mountain in the Hatay province of Turkey. In 1915, it was the location of a successful Armenian resistance to the Armenian genocide, an event that inspired Franz Werfel to write the novel The Forty Days of Musa Dagh.

History

The deportation orders of the Armenian population of modern-day Turkey, issued by the Ottoman government, in July 1915 reached the six Armenian villages of the Musa Dagh region: Kabusia (Kaboussieh), Yoghunoluk, Bitias, Vakef, Kheter Bey (Khodr Bey) and Haji Habibli. As Ottoman Turkish forces converged upon the town, the populace, aware of the impending danger, refused deportation and fell back upon Musa mountain, thwarting assaults for fifty-three days, from July to September 1915. One of the leaders of the revolt was Movses Der Kalousdian, whose Armenian first name was the same as that of the mountain. Allied warships, most notably the French 3rd Squadron in the Mediterranean under command of Vice Admiral Louis Dartige du Fournet, sighted the survivors just as ammunition and food provisions were running out. Five French ships, beginning with the protected cruiser , under the command of Captain Jean-Joseph Brisson, evacuated 3,004 women and children and over 1,000 men from Musa Dagh to safety in Port Said.

Starting in 1918, when the Sanjak of Alexandretta came under French control, the population of the six Armenian villages returned to their homes. In 1932, a monument was erected at the top of the mountain to commemorate the event.

The mountain was in Aleppo Vilayet, Ottoman Empire, until after World War I, when the French took possession and put it in Sanjak of Alexandretta, Mandate of Syria.

On 29 June 1939, following an agreement between France and Turkey, the province was given to Turkey. Afterwards Armenians from six of the villages emigrated from Hatay Province, while some of the residents of Vakıflı village chose to stay. Vakıflı is the only remaining ethnic Armenian village in Turkey, with a population of only 140 Turkish-Armenians. Most who left Hatay in 1939 emigrated to Lebanon where they resettled in the town of Anjar. Today, the town of Anjar is divided into six districts, each commemorating one of the villages of Musa Dagh.

As the French squads came to the rescue of the survivors, the chief priest is quoted as having said, "The evil only happened … to enable God to show us His goodness." This event was depicted in The Promise  -  a 2016 American epic historical drama film directed by Terry George and starring Oscar Isaac, Charlotte Le Bon and Christian Bale, set in the final years of the Ottoman Empire.

The Forty Days of Musa Dagh

These historical events later inspired Franz Werfel to write his novel The Forty Days of Musa Dagh (1933), a fictionalized account based on his detailed research of historical sources. Werfel told reporters: "The struggle of 5,000 people on Musa Dagh had so fascinated me that I wished to aid the Armenian people by writing about it and bringing it to the world". A movie of the same name was released in 1982. Six years after the novel was published, when Nazi Germany started conquering Europe, the copies of “The Forty Days of Musa Dagh” spread widely among young adults, some of whom found themselves in circumstances similar to those faced by Armenians. The book was popular in Warsaw ghetto and Vilna ghetto and when the Jewish resisters decided to fight back in the Bialystok ghetto, they spoke of the ghetto’s “Musa Dagh” moment at the planning meeting.

See also
Armenia–France relations
The Forty Days of Musa Dagh
Vakıflı
The Promise, a 2016 film climaxing around the events of 1915 on Musa Dagh
Kessab

References

Further reading

External links
Official Website
Home of All Musa Daghians & Anjarians
Armenian National Institute entry on Musa Dagh

Armenian resistance during the Armenian genocide
History of Hatay Province
Former Armenian inhabited settlements